Disobedient may refer to:

 The Disobedient (Serbian: Neposlušni), a 2014 Serbian drama film 
 Disobedient (album), by American metalcore band Stick to Your Guns
 Disobedient, a live album by Chris Carter

See also 
 Disobedience (disambiguation)